
The Men's High Jump event at the 2007 World Championships in Athletics took place on August 27, 2007 (qualification), and August 29, 2007 (final), at the Nagai Stadium in Osaka, Japan.

Medallists

Records

Results

Qualification
Qualification: 2.29 m (Q) or best 12 performances (q)

Final

External links
Official results - IAAF.org

High jump
High jump at the World Athletics Championships